Thomas Hughes (1892 – 1 July 1916) was an English professional footballer who played in the Football League for Newcastle United. He was described as "a small and compact schemer" of an inside left.

Personal life 
Hughes served as a corporal in the Royal Northumberland Fusiliers during the First World War and was killed on the first day on the Somme. He is commemorated on the Thiepval Memorial.

Career statistics

References

1892 births
1916 deaths
People from South Hetton
Footballers from County Durham
English footballers
English Football League players
Association football inside forwards
Newcastle United F.C. players
British Army personnel of World War I
Military personnel from County Durham
Royal Northumberland Fusiliers soldiers
British military personnel killed in the Battle of the Somme